The U.S. Post Office-Caldwell Main in Caldwell, Idaho, is a 1-story, Classical Revival building constructed of brick with a sandstone foundation and terracotta decorations. Established in 1932, the Post Office features a marble entry flanked by terracotta pilasters below a leaded glass fan window. The design is credited to James A. Wetmore, acting supervising architect for the U.S. Treasury. The building was added to the National Register of Historic Places in 1989.

The building was constructed by contractor H.J. McNeal, and original dimensions were 69 feet by 74 feet. A 66-foot lawn separated the Post Office from the adjacent Elks Temple on Arthur Street. In 1965 the building was remodeled, and the Post Office expanded to include the former lawn area.

References

External links

		

National Register of Historic Places in Canyon County, Idaho
Neoclassical architecture in Idaho
Government buildings completed in 1932
Caldwell, Idaho